Bursa cantik pide is a traditional Turkish recipe for a dish of pizza dough filled cheese, ground meat, or other fresh or cured meats, and/or vegetables.

See also

Karelian pasty
Khachapuri
Vatrushka
Nokul
Pogača
Pogácsa
Pirozhki
Fatayer

References

Turkish cuisine
Savoury pies